Enjoy Yourself is the fourth studio album by American country music artist Billy Currington. It was released on September 21, 2010 via Mercury Nashville. Four singles were released from the album, including the Number Ones "Pretty Good at Drinkin' Beer" and "Let Me Down Easy."

Background
In an interview with The Boot, Currington talked about the album, and how if reflects who he is as a person. “It’s a great mix, it reflects who I am. I’m definitely not just one thing. I’m the beach guy, I’m the country guy, I love my dirt roads and fishin’, but I love New York City and L.A. and Miami, too. "It's been a process for this particular project for like five years when I go back through my songs. I've been stashing all these songs that I get pitched every year in this one little spot on my computer – it's probably been more like 10 years of songs now – and so I feel like I'm so stashed up with songs that I didn't need to write or look for them."

Recording
Currington explained the recording behind Enjoy Yourself, saying "This record was about recording songwriter’s songs, I could have gone back and recorded a bunch of mine that I’ve written, but there were a lot of writers I wanted to record, like Shawn and Troy. I had to put their songs on this album.”

Reception

Commercial
The album debuted at number nine on the U.S. Billboard 200 chart after selling 45,000 copies, becoming his first Top 10 album on that chart. It also peaked at  number two on the U.S. Billboard Top Country Albums chart. As of the chart dated June 25, 2011, the album has sold over 329,489 copies in the United States.

Critical

Upon its release, Enjoy Yourself received generally positive reviews from most music critics. At Metacritic, which assigns a normalized rating out of 100 to reviews from mainstream critics, the album received an average score of 68, based on 4 reviews, which indicates "generally favorable reviews".

Matt Bjorke with Roughstock gave it a three and a half out of five star rating, saying that Currington "has perfected his formula; Enjoy Yourself is a mostly jovial affair that really feels like a tight collection of escapist, feel-good music. Stephen Thomas Erlewine with Allmusic also gave it a three and a half out of five star rating, saying "Everything rolls just a little bit too easily [...] its mellow vibes and occasional soft romantic touch feel true to Currington." Greg Victor with Parcbench gave it a 3½ rating, commenting "This album is full of music makes you want to dance and laugh and sing along; this album is the one I put on for my own enjoyment."

The Associated Press' Michael McCall said that "[on] Enjoy Yourself he zeroes in on an easy-going soul vibe, a sound that brings out a likable quality in Currington's Georgia-raised tenor." Bill Friskics-Warren with The Washington Post gave it a mixed review, saying that "[Currington] can pride himself on having made a record with the sort of warmth and intimacy that gives the work of neo-traditionalist elders such as George Strait and Alan Jackson such staying power." He also called the track "Like My Dog" "The only real misstep".

Jessica Phillips with Country Weekly gave it three stars, commented saying that it is "a perfect sleepy and summery soundtrack; this collection largely falls headlong into leisurely tales of drinking and fishing rather than the more spirited or smouldering fare that spurred earlier hits." Blake Boldt with Engine 145 gave it two and a half stars out of five, calling it a "pretty bland modern country album" and said that Currington "is a little too spic-and-span. None of these ten songs is even remotely suspenseful; conflicts and concerns are neatly wrapped up within four minutes." Dave Heaton with PopMatters gave it five out of ten stars, and criticized the songwriting on the album, saying " on a songwriting level, Currington has dropped any real storytelling emphasis or attention to specific details.

Track listing

Personnel

Production
 Maggie Berry – Design
 Darryl Bowslaugh – Groomer
 Jason Campbell – Production Coordination
 Carson Chamberlain – Producer
 Billy Currington – Producer
 Joe Fisher – A&R
 Luellyn Latocki Hensley – Art Direction
 John Kelton – Engineer, Mixing
 Ken Love – Mastering
 Lee Moore – Wardrobe
 Karen Naff – Art Direction
 Kate Powers – Photography
 Matt Rovey – Engineer
 Brian Wright – A&R
 Stephanie Wright – A&R

Additional musicians
 J. T. Corenflos – Electric Guitar (all tracks)
 Billy Currington – Lead Vocals (all tracks), Background Vocals (track 2)
 Smith Curry – Lap Steel Guitar (track 10)
 Paul Franklin – Steel Guitar (all tracks except 8 and 10), Pedabro (track 8)
 Barry Green – Trombone (track 2)
 Wes Hightower – Background Vocals (tracks 2,3,5,8-10)
 Paul Leim – Drums (all tracks)
 Brent Mason – Electric Guitar (all tracks)
 Steve Patrick – Trumpet (track 2)
 Gary Prim – Hammond B3 Organ (tracks 1,7), Keyboards (track 4), Piano (tracks 1-3,5,8,10), Wurlitzer (tracks 6,9)
 Chris Rodriguez – Background Vocals (tracks 1,2,4,6,7)
 W. David Smith – Bass guitar (all tracks except 8), Upright Bass (track 8)
 Biff Watson – Acoustic Guitar (all tracks)

Chart performance

Weekly charts

Year-end charts

Singles

ADid not enter the Hot 100 but charted on Bubbling Under Hot 100 Singles.

Certifications

References

2010 albums
Billy Currington albums
Mercury Nashville albums
Albums produced by Carson Chamberlain